Friedrich Olbricht (4 October 1888 – 21 July 1944) was a German general during World War II and one of the plotters involved in the 20 July Plot, an attempt to assassinate Adolf Hitler  in 1944. He was a senior staff officer, with the rank of lieutenant general. He was secretly in contact with most of the leaders of the resistance. They briefed him on their various plots and he placed sympathetic officers in key positions. He quietly encouraged field commanders to support the resistance. By late 1943 his office was the centre of Resistance plotting, under Claus von Stauffenberg.  Had the 20 July plot to assassinate Adolf Hitler been successful, he would have assumed the position of Minister of Finance in a post-Nazi regime.

Early life
Olbricht was born on 4 October 1888 in Leisnig, Saxony, to Richard Olbricht, a mathematics professor and director of the Realschule (secondary school) in Bautzen.

Career

Olbricht successfully passed the Abitur (university preparatory school exit examination) in 1907, subsequently accepting a commission as a Fahnrich (ensign) with Infantry Regiment 106 in Leipzig. He fought in World War I, was promoted to captain and chose to stay in the Treaty of Versailles-decimated military (the Reichswehr) after the war.

Olbricht was assigned to the Reich Defense Ministry as leader of the Reichswehr's Foreign Armies Bureau in 1926. After the Night of the Long Knives raid, he was able to save several of those arrested from execution by finding or creating positions for them in the Abwehr.

Olbricht was appointed chief of staff of the 4th Army Corps stationed in Dresden in 1935, an assignment that lasted until 1938 when he was promoted to commander of the 24th Infantry Division.

Olbricht has the distinction of being one of the few officers who supported General Werner von Fritsch, the commander in chief of the German armed forces who was accused of homosexuality in January 1938. After von Fritsch’s resignation, it was discovered that the charges had been invented, based on the contrived testimony of a man whom some say was recruited by Himmler. The tale had been concocted as part of Hitler's plan to gain control of the armed forces—which he did.

During the German invasion of Poland in 1939, Olbricht commanded the 24th Infantry Division and was awarded the Knight's Cross of the Iron Cross. On 15 February 1940, Olbricht was promoted to General of the Infantry. He was appointed Chief of the General Army Office (Allgemeines Heeresamt) in the Army High Command (Oberkommando des Heeres). He was furthermore made Chief of the Armed Forces Reserve Office (Wehrersatzamt) at the Oberkommando der Wehrmacht.

Operation Valkyrie

Starting in the winter of 1941–42, Olbricht developed the plan for Operation Valkyrie, a General Staff plan which was ostensibly to be used to put down internal unrest, but was in fact a blueprint for a coup d'état. Together with the resistance circles around Colonel-General Ludwig Beck, Carl Friedrich Goerdeler and Major-General Henning von Tresckow, he worked to find a means of assassinating Adolf Hitler and using the coup plan to bring down the Nazi regime.  In 1943, he asked that Colonel Claus von Stauffenberg come to work at his office; Stauffenberg would later be the key man in the assassination attempt, with the job of actually planting the bomb near Hitler.

On the day of the attempted coup d'état, 20 July 1944, Olbricht and Colonel Albrecht Mertz von Quirnheim initiated Operation Valkyrie by mobilizing the Replacement Army (Ersatzheer). It eventually became clear that Stauffenberg's briefcase bomb had failed to kill Hitler, however, and so the plan to seize key sites in Berlin using units from the reserve army began to falter. Many consider one of the overwhelming factors which prevented this coup from gathering any real pace was the failure of troops on the ground to gain control of the communications coming into and out of Berlin; Adolf Hitler and his commanders in the Wolfsschanze were able to broadcast a speech after the coup which in turn led to the quick demise of the coup as a whole.  As a result, the Nazi leadership was able to regain control using its own loyal troops within a few hours.

Arrest and execution
At 21:00, Olbricht was arrested at his headquarters in the Bendlerblock by soldiers from the Berlin garrison. Later that evening, Colonel-General Friedrich Fromm held a hastily-arranged court martial, supposedly in an attempt to protect himself from being exposed as a silent conspirator. Olbricht, Quirnheim, Stauffenberg, and his aide Werner von Haeften were then taken outside to the courtyard and executed by firing squad, against Hitler's orders to take the would-be assassins alive (those who were captured alive received more painful and prolonged means of execution). Olbricht was the first of the four to be shot.

Awards 

Knight's Cross of the Iron Cross on 27 October 1939 as Generalleutnant and commander of 24. Infanterie-Division
Grand Cross of the Order of the White Rose of Finland on 22 December 1941 as General der Infanterie

In popular culture
He appears in all dramatisations of the July 1944 plot, being played by Wolfgang Büttner in The Plot to Assassinate Hitler (1955), Erik Frey in Jackboot Mutiny (1955) Michael Byrne in The Plot to Kill Hitler (1990), Rainer Bock in Stauffenberg (2004) and Bill Nighy in Valkyrie (2008).

See also
List of members of the 20 July plot

References

Citations

Bibliography

 Hoffman, Peter. History of the German Resistance (MIT, 1977).
 
 Schrader, Helena. Codename Valkyrie General Friedrich Olbricht and the plot against Hitler; Haynes Publishing 2009.

In German
 Georgi, Friedrich (1989). Soldat im Widerstand. General der Infanterie Friedrich Olbricht; 2. Aufl., Berlin u. Hamburg. .
Helena P. Page, General Friedrich Olbricht. Ein Mann des 20. Juli; 2. Aufl., Bonn u. Berlin 1994 (Note the author of this book is better known under her married name Helena Schrader.)

External links

Report from Olbricht's son-in-law Friedrich Georgi about the talk on 20 July, in which Olbricht explained his motivations, just before he was arrested.

1888 births
1944 deaths
People from Leisnig
Military personnel from Saxony
People from the Kingdom of Saxony
German Army personnel of World War I
German Army generals of World War II
Generals of Infantry (Wehrmacht)
People executed by Nazi Germany by firing squad
Recipients of the clasp to the Iron Cross, 1st class
Recipients of the Knight's Cross of the Iron Cross
Executed members of the 20 July plot
Executed military leaders
People from Saxony executed by Nazi Germany
Reichswehr personnel